Eupithecia vivida is a moth in the family Geometridae. It is found in Afghanistan, China (Lijiang, Tibet) and northern India.

References

Moths described in 1978
vivida
Moths of Asia